Compulsion Games Inc. is a Canadian video game developer and a studio of Xbox Game Studios based in Montreal. Established in 2009 by ex-Arkane Studios developer Guillaume Provost, the studio developed the 2013 puzzle-platform game Contrast and the 2018 survival horror game We Happy Few.

History 
Compulsion Games was founded in Montreal in 2009 by Guillaume Provost, who had previously worked for Arkane Studios. To raise funds for their first game, the team of Compulsion Games worked on external projects, including Darksiders, Dungeon & Dragons: Daggerdale, Bagelburg: The Bagelening, and Arthur Christmas: Elf Run.

At E3 2018, Microsoft announced they entered into an agreement to acquire Compulsion Games, which would become part of Microsoft Studios (now known as Xbox Game Studios). At the time of the acquisition, Compulsion Games had 40 employees. By October 2021, the studio had further doubled its staff since the release of We Happy Few, and was working on a narrative, third-person perspective game, though would avoid some missteps from We Happy Few, such as using roguelike elements or an early access approach.

Games developed

Contrast (2013) 
Contrast is a twilight adventure suspended in Belle Époque magics and Art Nouveau esthetics, with a film noir atmosphere and haunting soundtrack (Shadow Music: A Soundtrack to Contrast). Contrast is set in the 1920s, blending influences from the 1920s Burlesque and Vaudeville era with some more classic film-noir elements from the 1940s. The player controls Dawn, the imaginary friend of a little girl, Didi, who has the power to turn into her own shadow. She can do this any time, provided there is a lit area where Dawn's shadow can be seen. The original gameplay is based on the interplay of shadows and lights; Dawn has the ability to transit from the colourful 3D world of the streets of Paris into the two-dimensional world of shadows, flattening herself on the walls of buildings or rooms. The player can face unusual 2D platform levels, provided the presence of favourable sources of light that can be moved to solve the puzzles. Provost worked with Valve around the time that the original video game Portal was released, and was inspired by how the Portal series encouraged people to think about space in different ways. The idea of 2D shadow/3D world interaction came to him in a coffee shop in France, and seemed to be a great way of exploring new puzzle mechanics. The film noir world, and the narrative, flowed from this concept.

We Happy Few (2018) 
We Happy Few is a "cheerful" dystopia set in a fictional English city, Wellington Wells, which is inspired by the psychedelic London of the '60s. It is about a retrofuturistic-fashioned society formed following an alternate timeline of events within World War II, which is on the verge of collapse in the mid-1960s. The residents of the city, seeking to forget an unspeakable horror they committed, began taking a hallucinogenic drug called "Joy" that brings them euphoria, but also leaves them easily controlled and lacking morality and understanding. Players control one of three characters, who becomes dubbed as a "Downer" after choosing to stop using Joy, and must try to survive long enough to complete something important and personal to themselves, all while trying to escape the city before the impending social collapse. Played from a first-person perspective, the game combines role-playing, survival, and light roguelike elements, with the developers focused on creating a story with strong narratives, gameplay underlined by a sense of paranoia, and decisions having moral grey areas and weight that influence and affect later parts of the game. This peculiar mix of laughter and dystopia, another "contrast" after the lights and shadows of the previous title, is inspired by the film Brazil by Terry Gilliam, in turn inspired by the quintessential dystopian novel, George Orwell's Nineteen Eighty-Four. In the first trailers, traces of Stanley Kubrick's film A Clockwork Orange can be recognized. The aesthetic resembles BioShock because Compulsion Games seems particularly linked to the Art Deco style, also present in Contrast. The world of We Happy Few is procedurally generated.

References

External links 
 

2009 establishments in Quebec
2018 mergers and acquisitions
Canadian companies established in 2009
Companies based in Montreal
First-party video game developers
Microsoft subsidiaries
Video game companies established in 2009
Video game companies of Canada
Video game development companies
Xbox Game Studios